Moonlight Murder is a 1936 American crime film directed by Edwin L. Marin and written by Florence Ryerson and Edgar Allan Woolf. The film stars Chester Morris, Madge Evans, Leo Carrillo, Frank McHugh, Benita Hume, Grant Mitchell, Katharine Alexander and J. Carrol Naish. The film was released on March 27, 1936, by Metro-Goldwyn-Mayer.

Plot
An amateur detective gets a chance to test his sleuthing skills when an opera singer is murdered at the Hollywood Bowl.

Cast 
Chester Morris as Steve Farrell
Madge Evans as Toni Adams
Leo Carrillo as Gino D'Acosta
Frank McHugh as William
Benita Hume as Diana
Grant Mitchell as Dr. Adams
Katharine Alexander as Louisa Chiltern 
J. Carrol Naish as Bejac
H. B. Warner as Godfrey Chiltern	... 	
Duncan Renaldo as Pedro
Leonard Ceeley as Ivan Bosloff
Robert McWade as Police Chief Quinlan
Pedro de Cordoba as Swami
Charles Trowbridge as Stage Manager

References

External links 
 

1936 films
1930s English-language films
American crime films
1936 crime films
Metro-Goldwyn-Mayer films
Films directed by Edwin L. Marin
American black-and-white films
Films scored by Herbert Stothart
Films with screenplays by Florence Ryerson
Films with screenplays by Edgar Allan Woolf
Films scored by Edward Ward (composer)
1930s American films
Films set in Los Angeles